The name Triangle of Death was given to an area SW of Algiers, whose apexes are Blidah, Médéah and Hadjout, where some of the worst massacres of the 1990s took place.

References

Algerian Civil War
Blida
History of Algiers
Médéa Province